The 2010 Oklahoma City Yard Dawgz season is the 7th season for the franchise, and the first in the Arena Football League, coming from the AF2, which dissolved following the 2009 season. The team was coached by Sparky McEwen and played their home games at the Cox Convention Center. The Yard Dawgz did not qualify for the postseason after finishing with a 6–10 record and placing 6th in the American Conference.

Standings

Regular season schedule
The Yard Dawgz began the season at home against the Sharks on April 3. They hosted the Talons in their final regular season game.

Note: Intra-division opponents are in bold text.
All times are CDT

Roster

Regular season

Week 1: vs. Jacksonville Sharks

The game did not feature many scores by either team in the first two quarters, but when the Sharks began to build a lead following halftime, and the Yard Dawgz were down 34–17 at the start of the 4th quarter. Their attempt at a comeback fell short after an onside kick was returned for a touchdown by Jacksonville late in the final period. Quarterback Tommy Grady threw for 219 yards, however the total offense for the Yard Dawgz was only 202 yards.

Week 2: BYE

Week 3: vs. Cleveland Gladiators

Cleveland scored the first and only touchdown of the 1st quarter, but in the 2nd quarter the teams combined for 52 points. The Gladiators opened the 2nd quarter scoring with a 5-yard touchdown pass, but the Yard Dawgz took the ensuing kickoff back for a touchdown. With under a minute left in the 2nd quarter, the Gladiators scored on an 11-yard touchdown pass to take a 28–21 lead. The Yard Dawgz followed with a quick touchdown drive of their own that was capped off by a 10-yard passing touchdown to tie the game. With little time remaining in the half, the Matt Denny kicked a 28-yard field goal to give the Gladiators a 31–28 lead at halftime. The Yard Dawgz took control of the game in the 3rd quarter with a pair of touchdowns and never looked back, earning their first win of the season with a 63–50 win. Tommy Grady threw for 276 yards and 4 touchdowns. Al Hunt had 3 rushing touchdowns on 5 carries, but actually finished the game with a total of −1 yard.

Week 4: at Iowa Barnstormers

Oklahoma was the first to score, a 15-yard touchdown reception by Anthony Hines. Iowa also scored a touchdown on their first possession, but the extra point was blocked by Quartez Vickerson. Vickerson lateraled the ball to Fred Shaw, who took it to the end zone for 2 points. On the ensuing kickoff, Oklahoma City's Craig Fulton Jr. fumbled during the return, and Larry Kendrick picked it up for the Barnstormers and scored a touchdown. By halftime, the Yard Dawgz led 31–27. They led by the same margin following the 3rd quarter. In the 4th quarter, the Yard Dawgz fell behind after giving up two touchdowns to the Barnstormers before scoring their first points of the quarter on an A.J. Haglund field goal. With less than a minute left, Iowa quarterback Ryan Vena ran in his second touchdown of the final period to put the Barnstormers up by 14. The Yard Dawgz engineered a 5-play, 35-yard drive resulting in a touchdown to cut the deficit to just 7-points with 23 seconds remaining. However, the onside kick attempt was returned for a touchdown by Iowa. Oklahoma City would score another touchdown, but with no time left on the clock, the game was over. Tommy Grady threw for 383 yards and 6 touchdowns. Xavier Lee led all receivers with 117 yards, but just 1 touchdown.

Week 5: at Dallas Vigilantes

Oklahoma City fell behind 20–0 in the 1st quarter, but managed to take a 21–20 lead with less than 3 minutes left in the 2nd quarter. However, the Vigilantes scored 3 touchdowns in the final minute of the half, including intercepting one of Tommy Grady's passes and returning it for a touchdown. At halftime, the Yard Dawgz were losing 41–20. The 2nd half did not feature much scoring by either team, and the Yard Dawgz lost by a final score of 55–34. Oklahoma City was outgained in total offense 244–179. Grady threw only 4 touchdowns and had 205 passing yards in the game. Timon Marshall was one of six Yard Dawgz to receive a pass, leading all of them with 88 yards and 3 touchdowns.

Week 6: vs. Bossier–Shreveport Battle Wings

Week 7: vs. Spokane Shock

Week 8: at Tulsa Talons

Week 9: vs. Alabama Vipers

Week 10: at Tampa Bay Storm

Week 11: at Arizona Rattlers

Week 12: BYE

Week 13: vs. Dallas Vigilantes

Week 14: at Bossier–Shreveport Battle Wings

Week 15: vs. Iowa Barnstormers

Week 16: at Cleveland Gladiators

Week 17: at Orlando Predators

Week 18: vs. Tulsa Talons

References

Oklahoma City Yard Dawgz
Oklahoma City Yard Dawgz seasons
2010 in sports in Oklahoma